The Social Hub (TSH) formerly known as The Student Hotel is a hybrid hospitality brand, offering spaces that combine student accommodation, hotel, extended stay rooms, co-working facilities, meeting and event spaces, restaurant, bars and gyms, all under one community and one roof. Originally conceived as a city-centre accommodation option for students, today’s hybrid business has evolved rapidly. TSH was founded by Scottish entrepreneur Charlie MacGregor in 2006. As of 2022 TSH has expanded to 15 locations including Amsterdam, Berlin, Paris, Florence, and Barcelona. TSH expects to open another 10 hotels across Europe by 2025, increasing its operation to 25 hotels. In 2022, it plans to open hotels in Madrid, Barcelona and Toulouse.

Under MacGregor’s leadership, TSH has been acknowledged by Deloitte as one of 51 best managed companies in the Netherlands 2017-18, achieving Gold status, having been included for more than four years. As founder and CEO of this innovative concept, MacGregor has reimagined the concept of ‘hybrid’ city centre accommodation for an expanding customer base of internationally-minded students, entrepreneurs and travelers who seek more than the anonymity of a box room in a building that sits in grand isolation from the community that surrounds it. The result is a melting pot of disparate groups and nationalities who meet, socialise, share ideas and create friendships, forming a cohesive community.

TSH has partnered with internationally renowned events such as Forbes 30 Under 30 Europe in 2018, Pride Amsterdam in 2021 and 2022, and with Radio538 during Amsterdam Dance Event in 2017.

Furthermore, TSH has hosted workshops and events with successful entrepreneurs, organizing The Climate College Tour which hosted Boyan Slat, founder of The Ocean Cleanup and Ron Simpson, founder of The Avocado Show. During the opening of its Florence location, TSH hosted “bed talks”, during which artists, musicians and creative types sat on the hotel beds and discussed, among other things, the power of innovation, sustainable mobility and success in the age of social media. TSH also focuses on partnerships with educational institutions, having teamed up with the Global School for Entrepreneurship, the first university built by and for startups.

Awards 
The Social Hub received the Worldwide Hospitality Awards’ Best Innovation Hotel Individual Initiative in 2014.

TSH won MIPIM’s Best Mixed-Use Development Award in 2019.

TSH was awarded a Best-In-Class Award in 2016 for Best Student Housing Property and 2017 for Best New Student Housing Development.

TSH Maastricht was nominated for the 2018 Frame Awards’ Best Use of Color.

TSH Delft was shortlisted together with The Invisible Party in the Frame Awards 2021 for the top 5 “learning space of the year”.

TSH was shortlisted as a finalist in The PIEoneer Awards 2021 in the categories ‘International student living award ‘and ‘Public/private partnership of the year’ for collaborating with CODAM Coding College.

TSH Eindhoven, Florence, Amsterdam City, Groningen, The Hague, Rotterdam, Amsterdam West, Maastricht, and Berlin received the 2021 TripAdvisor #TravelChoice Award. The award is given to hotels that consistently earn great reviews from travelers and are ranked within the top 10% of properties on TripAdvisor.

Sustainability 
The chain was awarded €82 Million in 2019, in Green Financing for Toulouse and Paris, to improve its sustainability by incorporating ESG targets. It also contributes to various social, environmental and ethical causes. In 2022, TSH has received a €145 million social and environmental impact financing from Italian bank Unicredit for the development of its Rome and second Florence locations, planning to open in 2024.

In alignment with their sustainability journey, TSH has achieved BREEAM In-Use sustainability certification for seven of its eight Dutch properties. The Building Research Establishment Environmental Assessment Method is a certification used to measure the sustainable built environment, assessed on land use and ecology, pollution and emissions, water and energy sourcing and usage, and quality of internal environments ensuring improved health and well-being. For example, all Netherlands locations received a rating between ‘Very Good’ to ‘Excellent’.  All new TSH properties are certified with the ‘Very Good’ rating being the minimum.

Growth 

The Social Hub has raised several rounds of investments, including €150 million (£118m) from Perella Weinberg Real Estate in 2014 and €100 million from APG in 2015. In 2019, the company secured a €82 million green finance package from Credit Agricole for development of its location in Paris and refurbishment of its Toulouse location. In 2021, the company announced a €300 million funding from investors Aermont and APG, allowing it to start the construction of seven new hotels in key European cities. In 2022, TSH has received a €145 million in impact financing from Italian bank Unicredit for the development of its Rome and second Florence locations, planning to open in 2024.

TSH is investing €1.8bn in its international growth strategy, bringing its total number of rooms to 17,550.

In 2016, it acquired the Carlyle Group's 85% stake in three properties located in Amsterdam, Rotterdam and The Hague and locations are currently under development in Lisbon, Glasgow, Madrid, Barcelona, Porto, Florence.

Locations 

As of 2022, TSH has 15 locations including Amsterdam, Berlin, Paris, Florence, and Barcelona. TSH expects to open another 10 hotels across Europe by 2025, increasing its operation to 25 hotels. In 2022, it will open hotels in Madrid, Barcelona and Toulouse.

References 

2005 establishments in the Netherlands